The Miss North Carolina competition selects the representative for the state of North Carolina to compete in the annual Miss America competition. The competition has been held in Raleigh every year since 1978. Prior to that, it was held in various locales including Charlotte, Greensboro, Winston-Salem, Durham, Burlington, Wilmington, and Morehead City.

Karolyn Martin of Charlotte was crowned Miss North Carolina 2022 on June 25, 2022, at High Point Theatre in High Point, North Carolina. She competed for the title of Miss America 2023 at the Mohegan Sun in Uncasville, Connecticut in December 2022.

75th anniversary
The Miss North Carolina pageant celebrated its 75th anniversary in 2012. For pageant week, all living former Miss North Carolina titleholders were invited back for a reunion. The "Miss North Carolina Sisterhood" sponsored a special gala the night before the pageant on June 22, 2012. This was highlighted with a special exhibit at the North Carolina Museum of History and 43 former Miss North Carolinas (the oldest being Miss North Carolina 1946, Trudy Riley Kearny) coming to the week's events, including Miss America 1962, Maria Fletcher. In addition, all of the former titleholders were invited for a special honorary luncheon at the North Carolina Executive Mansion, the first luncheon held there since the 1960s. This also marked the first time in 17 years that the pageant has been televised throughout the state. It was televised on the special events channel of Time Warner Cable.

Gallery of past titleholders

Results summary 
The following is a visual summary of the past results of Miss North Carolina titleholders at the national Miss America pageants/competitions. The year in parentheses indicates the year of the national competition during which a placement and/or award was garnered, not the year attached to the contestant's state title.

Placements 
 Miss Americas: Maria Fletcher (1962)
 1st runners-up: Constance Dorn (1973), Susan Lawrence (1976), Michelle Warren (1998), Kelli Bradshaw (1999)
 2nd runners-up: Ruth Covington (1937), Lu Ogburn (1952), Ann Herring (1961), Kirstin Elrod (2005)
 3rd runners-up: Clara Faye Arnold (1956)
 4th runners-up: Joey Augusta Paxton (1941), Betty Evans (1959), Jessica Jacobs (2008)
 Top 10: Elaine Herndon (1958), Jennifer Smith (1992)
 Top 13: Dorothy Johnson (1945)
 Top 15: Margaret Wood (1939), Misty Clymer (2003), Hailey Best (2012), Alexandra Badgett (2020)
 Top 16: Betty Hunneycutt (1937), Carolyn Edwards (1951)

Awards

Preliminary awards
 Preliminary Lifestyle and Fitness: Joey Augusta Paxton (1941), Lu Ogburn (1952), Clara Faye Arnold (1956), Elaine Herndon (1958), Betty Evans (1959), Maria Fletcher (1962), Monta Maki (1980), Elizabeth Williams (1983), Kelli Bradshaw (1999)
 Preliminary Talent: Margaret Wood (1939), Joey Augusta Paxton (1941), Lu Ogburn (1952), Scarlet Morgan (1991), Lisa Bamford (1996), Michelle Warren (1998), Adrienne Core (2011)

Non-finalist awards
 Non-finalist Talent: Sarah Stedman (1968), Elise Annette Johnson (1969), Patricia Johnson (1970), Cornelia Lerner (1971), Susan Griffin (1975), Deborah Shook (1979), Janet Ward Black (1981), Lynn Williford (1982), Elizabeth Williams (1983), Scarlet Morgan (1991), Dana Stephenson (1995), Lisa Bamford (1996), Jennifer Roberts (1997), Lorna McNeil (2001), Adrienne Core (2011), Arlie Honeycutt (2013), Beth Stovall (2015), McKenzie Faggart (2017)

Other awards
 Miss Congeniality: Jeanne Swanner (1964)
 Children's Miracle Network (CMN) Miracle Maker Award: Hailey Best (2012)
 Children's Miracle Network (CMN) Miracle Maker Award 1st runners-up: Victoria Huggins (2018), Alexandra Badgett (2020)
 Duke of Edinburgh Bronze Medalists: Hailey Best (2012), Arlie Honeycutt (2013)
 Equity & Justice Scholarship Award Winners: Alexandra Badgett (2020)
 Quality of Life Award 1st runners-up: Heidi Sue Williams (1993)
 Quality of Life Award 2nd runners-up: Dana Reason (2004)
 Quality of Life Award Finalists: Amanda Watson (2009)
Top Fundraiser 2nd runner-up: Carli Batson (2022)

Winners

References

External links
 Miss North Carolina official website

North Carolina
North Carolina culture
Women in North Carolina
Miss North Carolina winners
Annual events in North Carolina
1937 establishments in North Carolina
Recurring events established in 1937